The Ministry of Steel is an executive branch agency of the Government of India that is responsible for formulating all policies regarding steel production, distribution and pricing in India. As of July 2021, the ministry is headed by a Secretary Rank IAS officer he is the administrative head of ministry and the political Heads are

minister of cabinet rank, Jyotiraditya Scindia and is assisted by a Minister of State, Faggan Singh Kulaste.

Functions of the ministry 
Coordination of data from various sources for the growth of the iron and steel industry in India
Formulation of policies in respect of production, pricing, distribution, import and export of iron & steel and ferro alloys
Planning and development of and assistance to the entire iron and steel industry in the country
Development of the input industries relating to iron ore, manganese ore, refractories and others required by the steel industry

Attached/subordinate offices and institutes 
Joint Plant Committee (JPC)
A select organisation whose goal is the promotion of steel, coordinating work of the main producers
National Institute of Secondary Steel Technology (NISST)
NISST aims to be a single source for all the requirements of the secondary steel sector
 Biju Patnaik National Steel Institute
Situated in Puri, BPNSI is an institute of modern steel technology. It provides education and training, research and development, and consultancy to the steel sector.

Steel Consumers Council
The members of the Steel Consumers Council  are nominated by the Minister of Steel. The tenure of the council was initially fixed for two years, and it was re-constituted on 25 February 2010. The term of the present council is up to 29 February 2012.

Central Public Sector Undertakings 
Steel Authority of India Limited (SAIL)
National Mineral Development Corporation (NMDC)
Rashtriya Ispat Nigam Limited (RINL)
Kudremukh Iron Ore Company Ltd (KIOCL)
MECON Limited
Manganese Ore Limited (MOIL)
MSTC Limited
Sponge Iron India Limited (SIIL)
Ferro Scrap Nigam Limited (FSNL)

Steel Ministers of India

List of Ministers of State

References

External links
 of the Ministry of Steel

 
Steel